Rightaa Thappaa is a 2005 Indian Tamil drama film written and directed by journalist-turned-filmmaker R. Buvana. It stars Ramana, Uma and Seetha. The film, Buvana's first full-length feature film, deals with eve teasing and was based on a true incident. Karthik Raja composed the music and Mahesh Muthuswamy was the cinematographer. 

The film was first screened in 2004 before being theatrically released in 2005. For the year 2004, the film won two Tamil Nadu State Film Awards, the Tamil Nadu State Film Award for Best Family Film, and the Best Character Actor Award for Seetha  and an award at the Women Directors' film festival in Kerala.

Cast
 Ramana as Sathya
 Uma as Viji
 Seetha as Sathya's mother
 Bose Venkat
 Shanmugasundaram
 Meera Krishnan
 Rajasekhar
 Suryakanth
 Hemalatha as Sathya's sister
 Deena
 Avinash
 Manikandan

Soundtrack
The music composed by Karthik Raja.

Reception 
A critic from Rediff.com wrote that "Amid the unrealistic, just-titillation-no-plot Tamil films that are churned out every week, Righta Thappa will definitely stand out. There is no crude comedy, no action, no violence; you see only real emotions". Malathi Rangarajan of The Hindu wrote that the film is "A must-see for the youth and parents of today!"

References

2004 films
2000s Tamil-language films
2004 directorial debut films
Films scored by Karthik Raja